Nadia Santini is an Italian chef, best known for her restaurant Dal Pescatore, in Canneto sull'Oglio, Lombardy which has held three Michelin stars since 1996.

Biography
Santini was taught to cook at a young age by her future husband's great grandmother, Teresa. She has a cooking philosophy around the idea of a small restaurant, saying "I think it is impossible for a woman to run a kitchen that serves 100 people. I can't give my heart to a dish if I am cooking for more than 30."

Her restaurant Dal Pescatore is located in the hamlet of Canneto sull'Oglio in Lombardy, Italy. The restaurant is an extended trattoria, and was originally opened by Santini's husband's great grandparents in the 1910s. Nadia took over the running of the restaurant alongside her husband in 1974. In 1996, the restaurant was awarded three Michelin stars, with Santini becoming the first female chef in Italy to earn that level of accolade.

In 2010, German filmmaker Lutz Hachmeister created a television documentary called Three Stars, which Santini starred in amongst other chefs from Michelin starred restaurants. Her appearance in the documentary stood out, being described by critics as a "radiant personality and gentle, Old World approach to the nurturing of recipes, colleagues, and clientele provide the counterpoint to frenetic, confrontational kitchens run by scientist-chefs."

Santini has been highly regarded by other chefs, including French chef Anne-Sophie Pic who described her as "extraordinary" and an inspiration, and British chef Angela Hartnett has described Santini as one of her "heroes".

2013 saw Nadia being christened 2013 Veuve Clicquot World's Best Female chef from The World's 50 Best Restaurants by Restaurant magazine.

Personal life
Santini is married to her husband Antonio, who also works in Santini's restaurant but in reception rather than the kitchen. They met whilst at the University of Milan.

References

Living people
Italian chefs
Women chefs
Head chefs of Michelin starred restaurants
Year of birth missing (living people)